Adam Stanisław Walczak (born 7 December 1957) is a Polish footballer. He played in four matches for the Poland national football team from 1980 to 1981.

References

External links
 

1957 births
Living people
Polish footballers
Poland international footballers
Association football defenders
People from Sopot
Bałtyk Gdynia players
Zawisza Bydgoszcz players
Widzew Łódź players
Polish football managers
Bałtyk Gdynia managers